Phyllomorpha laciniata (the golden egg bug) is a species of coreid bug, and one of only two members of the genus Phyllomorpha. They are specific to the host plant Paronychia argentea. It is noted for its habit of laying its eggs on other members of its species, who act as mobile nests (oviposition substrate). These co-opted egg carriers provide more protection for the eggs than laying them at static locations on plant leaves or stems. While Phyllomorpha laciniata females can and do lay eggs on their host plant, the availability of suitable egg carriers seems to stimulate the deposition of mature eggs.

Taxonomy
This species was formally described by Charles Joseph de Villers in 1789, under the name Cimex laciniatus.

References

External links
 

Phyllomorphini